Gerald Eugene Pirtle (born December 3, 1947) is an American former pitcher in Major League Baseball who played briefly for the Montreal Expos in their 1978 season.

Career
Born in Tulsa, Oklahoma he attended Nathan Hale High School. Pirtle then attended Bacone College in Muskogee, OK. He was originally selected by the New York Yankees in the seventh round of the 1967 MLB Draft, playing for them in nine Minor League seasons spanning 1967–75. He later pitched in the Chicago Cubs minors system from 1976 to 1978, before signing as a free agent with Montreal in the 1978 midseason.

In 19 relief appearances for the Expos, Pirtle posted a 5.96 ERA with 2 losses, giving up 24 runs (17 earned) on 33 hits and 23 walks, while striking out 14 in 25 innings of work.

In between, Pirtle went 91–92 with a 3.48 ERA in 489 minor league games, and also played winter ball with the Navegantes del Magallanes club of the Venezuelan League in its 1972–73 season.

References

External links
, or Retrosheet, or Pura Pelota (Venezuelan Winter League)

1947 births
Living people
American expatriate baseball players in Canada
Bacone College alumni
Bacone Warriors baseball players
Baseball players from Oklahoma
Denver Bears players
Florida Instructional League Yankees players
Fort Lauderdale Yankees players
Johnson City Yankees players
Kinston Eagles players
Major League Baseball pitchers
Manchester Yankees players
Montreal Expos players
Navegantes del Magallanes players
American expatriate baseball players in Venezuela
Orlando Juice players
Rochester Red Wings players
Sportspeople from Tulsa, Oklahoma
Syracuse Chiefs players
West Haven Yankees players
Wichita Aeros players